Mabel Alabama-Pearl McVey (born 19 February 1996) is an English singer and songwriter. She had her breakthrough in 2017 with her single "Finders Keepers" which peaked at number eight on the UK Singles Chart. Her debut studio album High Expectations entered the UK Albums Chart at number three and was certified platinum. It included the UK top 10 singles: "Don't Call Me Up", "Mad Love" and "Boyfriend". She won the Brit Award for British Female Solo Artist in 2020.

Early life
Mabel Alabama-Pearl McVey was born on 19 February 1996 in Alhaurín el Grande, Málaga, Spain. She is the youngest child of English music producer Cameron McVey and Swedish singer Neneh Cherry. Through her mother, Mabel is the step-granddaughter of the American jazz musician Don Cherry and the niece of singer Eagle-Eye Cherry. Her sister Tyson, half-sister Naima and half-brother Marlon Roudette are also singers. The family lived in Alhaurín el Grande for two years prior to Mabel's birth before relocating back to Notting Hill, West London, England when she was two years old. 

At age four, she taught herself to read through phonetics and audiobooks, but soon developed anxiety from being sensitive to her surroundings and being bullied due to racial backgrounds. Her parents—who were against the use of medication—encouraged Mabel to express herself through music and a journal. The following year, she learned piano and wrote her first song. To help manage her anxiety, the family moved to Sweden when she was eight and lived in her mother's native countryside home near the town of Hässleholm. At age 15, Mabel enrolled at the Stockholm music school Rytmus Musikergymnasiet where she took a three-year course in songwriting, production and music theory.

Career

2015–2018: Bedroom and Ivy to Roses
After moving to London, Mabel released her debut single "Know Me Better" in July 2015, which caught the attention of BBC Radio 1 DJ Annie Mac, who made the song her Tune of the Week. Within weeks, Mabel signed a recording contract with Universal. In March 2017, after the releases of the 2015 and 2016 singles "My Boy My Town" and "Thinking Of You", she released "Finders Keepers" featuring British rapper Kojo Funds, which reached the Top 10 of the UK Singles Chart in late 2017. In May 2017, she released her debut extended play Bedroom.

In October 2017, Mabel released "Begging", the lead single from her debut mixtape Ivy to Roses, which was released shortly after. In December, she collaborated with Not3s on "My Lover". Following the January 2018 release of a second Not3s collaboration, "Fine Line", Mabel opened for English singer Harry Styles during the European part of the second leg of a tour in the support of his debut studio album. After her tour with Styles, she embarked on her own headline tour through the United Kingdom and Europe. In June, she was featured on "Ring Ring" alongside American rapper Rich the Kid and British DJ Jax Jones. Later that year, after releasing "One Shot", she co-wrote "Blind", a song for British girl group Four of Diamonds.

2019–2020: High Expectations 
In January 2019, Mabel was nominated for British Breakthrough Act at the 2019 Brit Awards. She re-released Ivy to Roses with a new cover art and the inclusion of all the singles that had been released since the first edition's release. With this, Mabel also released "Don't Call Me Up", which debuted at number 11 on the UK Singles Chart. The song peaked at number 3, becoming her highest-charting single to date. On 7 June 2019, she released "Mad Love", the second single from her debut studio album, High Expectations, which was released on 2 August that year. The song debuted at number 18 in the UK, later peaking at number 8.

Following the November 2019 release of her Christmas single Loneliest Time Of Year, in December 2019, Mabel performed at the Jingle Bell Ball, alongside other artists such as Ava Max, Rita Ora, Regard and The Script.

From January to March 2020, Mabel embarked on the High Expectations Tour across North America, the United Kingdom and Europe.

In February 2020, she released the song "Boyfriend". She then featured in a BBC Radio 1 Live Lounge cover of the Foo Fighters song "Times Like These" as part of the Live Lounge Allstars. This was organised in response to the ongoing COVID-19 pandemic. Later that year, in July, Mabel collaborated with AJ Tracey on "West Ten" and released an acoustic version of High Expectations. The following month, Clean Bandit released "Tick Tock" featuring Mabel and 24kGoldn.

2021–present: About Last Night... 
Following a teaser titled 'Allow me to reintroduce myself', posted to her social media in June 2021, "Let Them Know" was released on 18 June 2021. On 16 July 2021, Mabel released the song "Take It Home" as part of Pokémon's 25th anniversary album. In August 2021, she performed on the ITV2 reality series Love Island. On 29 October 2021, Mabel and Joel Corry released the song "I Wish". The song was followed by a cover of the Cyndi Lauper song "Time After Time", which she recorded for the 2021 McDonald's Christmas television advertisements. The second single, "Good Luck", featuring Jax Jones and Galantis was released on 18 March 2022. Mabel's second album is called About Last Night...

In November 2021, Mabel performed at Hits Live in Liverpool, alongside other artists such as Mimi Webb, The Script, Becky Hill, Joel Corry, Tom Grennan, Ella Henderson and Ed Sheeran.

About Last Night peaked at number 2 on the UK Albums Chart, Mabel's highest charting album to date, it also peaked at number 4 on the Scottish Albums Chart, once again her highest to date.

Discography

 High Expectations (2019)
 About Last Night... (2022)

Concert tours

Headlining
 These Are The Best Times Tour (2018)
 The Mad Love Tour (2019)
 High Expectations Tour (2020)

Promotional
 Intimate Shows (2022)

Supporting
 Harry Styles: Live on Tour (2018)
 LANY: Thrilla in Manila Tour (2019)
 Khalid: Free Spirit World Tour (2019)

Awards and nominations

Notes

References

External links

 

1996 births
Living people
People from Notting Hill
Singers from London
21st-century Black British women singers
21st-century English women singers
21st-century English singers
Brit Award winners
British contemporary R&B singers
English women pop singers
English people of Sierra Leonean descent
English people of Swedish descent
Capitol Records artists
Polydor Records artists
Universal Music Group artists